is a Japanese footballer currently playing as a centre back for FC Machida Zelvia, on loan from Urawa Reds.

Career statistics

Club
.

Notes

References

External links

2002 births
Living people
People from Hirosaki
Association football people from Aomori Prefecture
Japanese footballers
Association football defenders
J2 League players
J3 League players
Urawa Red Diamonds players
SC Sagamihara players
FC Machida Zelvia players